is a former Japanese football player.

Club statistics

References

External links

1981 births
Living people
Meiji University alumni
Association football people from Tokyo
Japanese footballers
J1 League players
J2 League players
J3 League players
Tokyo Verdy players
Yokohama FC players
Gainare Tottori players
Fukushima United FC players
Association football defenders
Universiade gold medalists for Japan
Universiade medalists in football